North Garden is a Census-designated place in Albemarle County, Virginia, United States. The population as of the 2020 United States census was 461.

Geography 
North Garden has a post office with ZIP code 22959.

Cocke's Mill House and Mill Site was added to the National Register of Historic Places in 1990.

References

Unincorporated communities in Albemarle County, Virginia
Unincorporated communities in Virginia